Cosmosoma oratha is a moth of the subfamily Arctiinae. It was described by Herbert Druce in 1893. It is found in Guyana.

References

oratha
Moths described in 1893